Room to Roam is the fifth studio album by the Waterboys; it continued the folk rock sound of 1988's Fisherman's Blues, but was less of a commercial success, reaching #180 on the Billboard Top 200 after its release in September 1990. Critical response continues to be mixed.  Allmusic describes it both as "not quite as [musically] successful" as Fisherman's Blues, but also as a "Celtic rock classic". The front and back covers were designed by Simon Fowler based upon photography by Stefano Giovannini and Sean Jackson.

Room to Roam is named after a passage in a George MacDonald book, Phantastes. The cover photography was done by Simon Fowler, and designed by Anni Siggins.

The album was recorded at Spiddal House in Galway, where the last recording sessions from the preceding album, Fisherman's Blues, had been recorded.  Room to Roam would be the last of The Waterboys' folk-rock sound until the release of Universal Hall in 2003. Fiddler Steve Wickham, who had been a large inspiration for the change to that sound for Fisherman's Blues, left the band shortly before Room to Roam was released.  The Waterboys briefly toured with a sound more akin to their early "Big Music" rock sound, before disbanding. Room to Roam was remastered in 2008 and released with a bonus disc of additional tracks from the original sessions.

Following the box set of outtakes and bonus songs of the Fisherman's Blues sessions, assembled in the Fisherman's Box, Mike Scott produced a box set of material from the 1989-1990 recording sessions in Spiddal. The 6CD set (5 CDs and 1 DVD) were issued as The Magnificent Seven - The Waterboys Fisherman's Blues/Room to Roam Band 1989-90 in late 2021. The box set contained 103 songs, many of them previously unreleased.

Background
Speaking of the album to Melody Maker in 1991, Scott said, "Room to Roam is my favourite album. Everything I was trying to say is on that album. I was disappointed it got received the way it did. I like it a lot. If you listen to it in terms of the first four Waterboys albums, it falls down, but if you listen to it on its own terms, it stands up. It stands up high."

Songs

"A Life of Sundays", which was more of a rock music song than the rest of the album's tracks and contained a small part of Yellow Submarine, reached #15 on Billboard'''s Modern Rock singles chart.

"Islandman" anthropomorphises Great Britain and Ireland as the speaker describes locations from these places as parts of the (human) body.  The lyrics offer some comments about the places that Scott had recently lived in the placements he chooses.  "Scotland", he sings, "is my dreaming head / Ireland is my Heart", but "London sprawls across my rump".

"The Raggle Taggle Gypsy" is a traditional folk ballad, which, according to Nick Tosches, tells the story of a true 17th-century love affair. The song's appearance on Room to Roam popularized it, and it has since been recorded by other Irish-folk musicians, as well as by Carlos Núñez on Os Amores Libres in 1999 with Scott. The recording was also emblematic of the band's sound for Fisherman's Blues and Room to Roam, in the same fashion that the single "The Big Music" came to describe the group's sound for the first three albums. The official Waterboys website refers to The Waterboys during this period as the "Raggle Taggle band".

"How Long Will I Love You?" was released as a single in Ireland.  On the 7-inch and cassette versions of the single, an alternative version of "When Will We Be Married", a traditional song that had appeared on Fisherman's Blues was the B-side. On the 12-inch and compact disc releases of the single were also a Ray Charles song, "Come Live with Me". The song's lyrics are a simple proclamation of undying love from the speaker; "How long will I love you? / As long as stars are above you / and longer if I can".

"Spring Comes to Spiddal" is an oddity compared to other Waterboys songs. The song, which refers to Spiddal, where much of Fisherman's Blues and all of Room to Roam were recorded, is arranged in a style that is a blend of folk music and New Orleans-style marching band music. The lyrics are a straightforward description of the town's inhabitants enjoying the season of spring.

The words "Further up, further in" are spoken by the character Aslan in The Last Battle by Christian fantasist C.S. Lewis, one of Scott's sources of inspiration. The lyrics describe a Joseph Campbell-style "hero's journey" to meet a king. Specifically, one verse describes travelling to the "end of the world" (which is a place, not a time in Waterboys lyrics) and meeting the king there, which is essentially the ending of Voyage of the Dawn Treader by Lewis. Another verse of the song describes a classic image of The Fool from the tarot.

The lyrics for "Room to Roam" are found in the books Lilith and Phantastes by the Scottish fantasist George MacDonald.

Track listing
All songs by Mike Scott unless otherwise noted.
 "In Search of a Rose" – 1:20
 "Song from the End of the World" – 1:59
 "A Man Is in Love" (Scott) / "Kaliope House" (Dave Richardson) – 3:18
 "Bigger Picture" (Scott, Anthony Thistlethwaite) – 2:26
 "Natural Bridge Blues" (Traditional, arranged by The Waterboys) – 2:06
 "Something That Is Gone" – 3:16
 "The Star and the Sea" – 0:26
 "A Life of Sundays" – 6:14
 "Islandman" – 2:06
 "The Raggle Taggle Gypsy" (Traditional, arranged by The Waterboys) – 2:58
 "How Long Will I Love You?" – 3:38
 "Upon the Wind and Waves" (Steve Wickham) – 0:44
 "Spring Comes to Spiddal" – 1:24
 "The Trip to Broadford" (Kieran Donnellan) – 1:14
 "Further Up, Further In" (Traditional, arranged by The Waterboys, words by Scott) – 5:19
 "Room to Roam" (George MacDonald, arranged by The Waterboys) – 3:08
 "The Kings of Kerry" (Scott, Sharon Shannon, Wickham) – 0:56

Note: on the original 1990 CD, "Kaliope House" is listed in the booklet as a separate track on its own instead of as a coda to "A Man Is in Love" (but on the actual CD is part of track 3 as normal), so that the track number of the track list from 4 to the end is shifted by one unit. Also on the original CD, the coda to "How Long Will I Love You?" is inserted as part of the following song, "Upon the Wind and Waves". On a later release, "Kaliope House"' is the fourth track (both on the CD and on the liner), and "The Kings of Kerry'" is not listed on the liner, whose tracking thus also has 17 items.

Collector's Edition Bonus disk track list (2008)
All songs by Mike Scott unless otherwise noted.
 "In Search of a Rose (full band)" – 2:29
 "My Morag (The Exile's Dream)" – 2:12
 "A Man is in Love (incl. Calliope House) (alternate)" – 3:20
 "The Wyndy Wyndy Road" – 1:53
 "Three Ships" – 3:22
 "Sunny Sailor Boy" – 3:06
 "Sponsored Pedal Pusher's Blues" – 2:50
 "The Wayward Wind" – 3:48
 "Danny Murphy / Florence" – 2:23
 "The Raggle Taggle Gypsy (live)" – 4:31
 "Custer's Blues (live)" – 4:37
 "Twa Recruitin' Sergeants (live)" – 4:10
 "A Reel and a Stomp in the Kitchen" – 0:52
 "Down by the Sally Gardens" – 3:48
 "A Strathspey in the Rain at Dawn" – 1:23
 "A Song for the Life" – 3:49
 "The Kings of Kerry (outdoor)" – 0:27

Personnel

The Waterboys
 Mike Scott – guitar, piano, lead vocals
 Colin Blakey – whistle, flute, Hammond organ, piano
 Anthony Thistlethwaite – saxophone, mandolin
 Steve Wickham – fiddle, Hammond organ; vocals on "Upon the Wind And Waves"
 Sharon Shannon – accordion, fiddle
 Trevor Hutchinson – bass guitar, bouzouki
 Noel Bridgeman – drums, percussion; backing vocals on "A Life of Sundays"
Additional personnel
 Roddy Lorimer – trumpet
 J. Neil Sidwell – trombone
 Kieran Wilde – clarinet
 Barry Beckett – piano on "Something that is Gone" and "How Long Will I Love You?"
 John "Turps" Burke – backing vocals
 Ken Samson – didjeridu
 Seamus Begley – backing vocals on "Room to Roam"
 Eileen Begley - backing vocals on "Room to Roam"
 Diarmuid O'Suilleabhan – backing vocals on "Room to Roam"
Technical
Tim Martin - engineer
Annie Siggins - sleeve design
Simon Fowler - photography

Charts

Notes and references

  
  
   
  
  Tosches, Nick (1996). Country:  The Twisted Roots of Rock 'N' Roll. Da Capo Press. .

External links
Lyrics at mikescottwaterboys.com
Official forum Chord requests are often fulfilled at "Musician's Corner"New York Times'' Review, Feb 2 1990

The Waterboys albums
1990 albums
Albums produced by Barry Beckett
Chrysalis Records albums